Allan Quay Shipley (born May 22, 1986) is a former American football coach and center who most recently was an offensive assistant for the Tampa Bay Buccaneers of the National Football League (NFL). He played twelve seasons in the (NFL) and was drafted by the Pittsburgh Steelers in the seventh round of the 2009 NFL Draft after playing college football for Penn State. Shipley spent most of his career with the Arizona Cardinals, but was also a member of the Philadelphia Eagles, Baltimore Ravens,  Indianapolis Colts, and Tampa Bay Buccaneers at different points.

Early years
Shipley attended Moon Area High School in Moon Township, Pennsylvania. As a team captain, he helped the football team reach the 2003 WPIAL Class AAA semifinals. He was a named to the Pittsburgh Post-Gazette Fabulous 22, the Pittsburgh Tribune-Review Terrific 25, and the Harrisburg Patriot-News Platinum 33 lists and played in the 2004 Big 33 Football Classic.  He also was a three-year starter in basketball, helping to lead the team to win the 2003–2004 PIAA state championship. He wrestled one year in high school at heavyweight, pinning the defending division IV state champion in his first match.

Regarded as four-star recruit by Rivals.com, Shipley was listed as the No. 12 defensive tackle prospect in the class of 2004.

College career
During his career at Penn State, Shipley switched positions on the offensive and defensive lines, several times. Shipley's redshirt freshman season at Penn State began with him playing on the offensive line and ended with him playing defense. At the beginning of the 2006 season Shipley was switched back to the offensive line and he spent the season as the starting center and anchored the offensive line for Tony Hunt's record-setting senior season. Shipley is known for his engaging personality and has served as the team Santa Claus for the Nittany Lions' annual Christmas party. He is known as a team leader who has sought out leadership positions. 

Shipley began the 2008 season on the Lombardi, Outland, and Rimington Trophy watchlists. By October, he had earned mid-season All-American honors from Sports Illustrated, College Football News, CBS Sports, and Phil Steele. At season's end, he was awarded the Rimington Trophy, awarded annually to the best center in college football. He was also named an All-American, a consensus first-team All-Big Ten selection, and the conference's Offensive Lineman of the Year.
Shipley earned a Bachelor of Science in labor studies from Penn State in 2008.

Shipley was a 2008 team captain for the Nittany Lions. He was the recipient of the 2008 Dave Rimington Trophy.

Professional career

Pittsburgh Steelers

Shipley was invited to the 2009 NFL Scouting Combine where he bench pressed 33 reps of 225 lbs. (fifth among offensive linemen at the combine) and measured a 31-inch vertical jump (eighth among offensive linemen at the combine). He ran 7.46 in the 3 cone drill and 4.40 in the 20-yard shuttle (second and fifth, respectively, among offensive linemen at the combine). Shipley also scored a 40 on the Wonderlic Test—double the average score for NFL draft prospects.

The Pittsburgh Steelers selected Shipley in the seventh round with the 226th overall pick the 2009 NFL Draft. He was the last of seven centers selected during the draft. On June 18, 2009, he signed a three-year, $1.22 million contract. He was waived on September 4, 2009 and was signed to the practice squad on September 6.

Philadelphia Eagles
On January 11, 2010, the Philadelphia Eagles signed him to a three-year contract. He was waived on September 4, 2010, and re-signed to the team's practice squad on September 5, 2010. He spent the entire season on the practice squad, and was re-signed to a future contract on January 10, 2011. He was waived during final cuts on September 2, 2011.

Indianapolis Colts
On January 29, 2012, the Indianapolis Colts signed Shipley, reuniting him with offensive coordinator Bruce Arians. Shipley competed with Samson Satele in training camp and was ultimately named the backup center to begin the season. He made his professional debut in the Colts' season-opening 21–41 loss at the Chicago Bears.

On October 7, 2012, Shipley made his first career start in place of an injured Samson Satele. He finished the regular season with five starts and played in 14 games.

Baltimore Ravens
On May 9, 2013, the Indianapolis Colts traded Shipley to the Baltimore Ravens for a 2014 conditional seventh-round draft pick.

He entered training camp competing with Gino Gradkowski for the vacant starting center position left by the retirement of Matt Birk. Shipley was named the backup to Gradkowski to begin the regular season. On November 3, 2013, Shipley made his first start of the season, in place of Gradkowski, during an 18–24 loss to the Cleveland Browns. He started the last nine games of the regular season, while appearing in all 16.

On August 30, 2014, Shipley was waived by the Ravens.

Indianapolis Colts (second stint)
On August 31, 2014, the Indianapolis Colts claimed Shipley off of waivers after starting center Khaled Holmes suffered an injury during the first snap of the preseason.

He was immediately inserted into a competition for the starting center position against rookie Jonotthan Harrison. Shipley was named the starting center for the season opener against the Denver Broncos. After starting and playing well in the first four games, he was surprisingly demoted to the backup position behind undrafted rookie Jonotthan Harrison. He finished the 2014 season playing in 15 games, started five, and was ranked as the 13th highest graded center in the NFL by Pro Football Focus.

Arizona Cardinals
On March 11, 2015, the Arizona Cardinals signed Shipley to a two-year, $1.57 million contract that includes $300,000 guaranteed and a $100,000 signing bonus. This reunited him with head coach Bruce Arians for the third time on their third different team.

Shipley entered training camp competing to be the Cardinal's starting center, but was named the backup to Ted Larsen. He made his Cardinals debut in their 31–19 season-opening victory over the New Orleans Saints. On October 26, 2015, he made his first start at center for the Cardinals in a 26–18 victory over the Baltimore Ravens. In his first season with the Arizona Cardinals, he appeared in 12 games and started three.

The following season, Shipley entered training camp competing with rookie Evan Boehm and veteran Taylor Boggs after Larsen departed for the Chicago Bears in free agency. The Arizona Cardinals named him their starting center to open the season. He started all 16 regular season games, as the Cardinals finished with a 7–8–1 record.

On March 9, 2017, the Arizona Cardinals signed Shipley to a two-year, $3.5 million contract extension, that includes a $725,000 signing bonus. He was the only offensive lineman for the Cardinals to start all 16 games for the second season in a row.

On August 6, 2018, Shipley tore his ACL in training camp and was ruled out for the season. On August 24, 2018, he signed a one-year contract extension with the Cardinals through the 2019 season.

In 2019, Shipley started all 16 games at center for the Cardinals.

Tampa Bay Buccaneers
On August 27, 2020, Shipley signed with the Tampa Bay Buccaneers, marking the fourth time he would play under Bruce Arians for the fourth different team. He was released during final roster cuts on September 5, but re-signed with the team three days later. Shipley would go on to start 2 games for Tampa Bay before suffering a neck injury. On November 26, head coach Bruce Arians announced that Shipley may have a career-ending neck injury, and he was placed on injured reserve two days later.

Ultimately, it was revealed that Shipley had suffered from what he described as a "bruised spinal cord", and at age 34 opted to retire rather than undergo surgery. Despite this, Shipley would get a Super Bowl ring for his earlier contributions after the Tampa Bay Buccaneers defeated the Kansas City Chiefs in Super Bowl LV, 31–9.

NFL career statistics

Coaching career
Following his retirement, Shipley was named an offensive assistant on the Tampa Bay Buccaneers' coaching staff on May 5, 2021.

Personal life
Shipley co-hosts “IN THE TRENCHES” a segment on the Pat McAfee Show  presented by Pat McAfee Inc. He is married and has two children.

References

Further reading
 "Shipley has become a mainstay on Penn State offensive line", Neil Geoghegan, DailyLocal.com, May 9, 2008.
 "I spy ... A.Q. Shipley", Flounders, Bob, The Patriot-News, November 24, 2008
 "A Jokester and Mentor", Jeff McLane, The Philadelphia Inquirer, December 26, 2008.
Shipley feels the buzz as he trains for draft in Tempe By Ron Musselman, Pittsburgh Post-Gazette, January 27, 2009

External links

Tampa Bay Buccaneers bio
Philadelphia Eagles bio
Pittsburgh Steelers bio
Penn State Nittany Lions bio 

1986 births
Living people
People from Coraopolis, Pennsylvania
Sportspeople from the Pittsburgh metropolitan area
Players of American football from Pennsylvania
American football centers
Penn State Nittany Lions football players
Pittsburgh Steelers players
Philadelphia Eagles players
Indianapolis Colts players
Baltimore Ravens players
Arizona Cardinals players
Tampa Bay Buccaneers players
Tampa Bay Buccaneers coaches